The Lie may refer to:

Books
The Lie (poem), c. 1592, political and social criticism poem probably written by Sir Walter Raleigh
The Lie (novel), a 1970 novel by Greek author Georges Sari
The Lie, a 2015 novel by English author Cally Taylor
The Lie, a play by Henry Arthur Jones
The Lie, a 2014 novel by Helen Dunmore
The Lie: Evolution, a 1987 book by Ken Ham

Film
The Lie (1912 film), a silent film starring King Baggot and Lottie Briscoe
The Lie (1914 film), a silent film featuring Murdock MacQuarrie, Pauline Bush, and Lon Chaney
The Lie (1918 film), a silent film starring Elsie Ferguson
The Lie (1950 film), a West German crime film
The Lie (1954 film), a West German-American TV movie produced by Burt Balaban
The Lie (1970 film), a Swedish television film
The Lie (1992 film), a French drama film about AIDS by François Margolin with Nathalie Baye
The Lie (2011 film), an American drama/comedy film written and directed by Joshua Leonard
The Lie (2018 film), a Canadian thriller film
The Lie (Lost), a 2009 episode of the television series Lost
The Lie (game show), an Irish quiz show

See also
Lie (disambiguation)